Hitomi Noda is a house wife who is the spouse of Yoshihiko Noda and served as First Lady of Japan.

Personal life 
She married with Yoshihiko Noda in the year 1992 and she have two sons.

Official Foreign Visits 

In 2012, She visited United States as First Lady of Japan to attend the program which was hosted by Michelle Obama.
In 2011, She visited India as a state visit with her husband.

References 

Spouses of prime ministers of Japan
Living people
1963 births